Meléndez-Torres is a surname. Notable people with the surname include:
Coleta Meléndez Torres (1885-1917), Mexican religious sister and candidate for canonisation
Gerardo J. Meléndez-Torres, Professor of Clinical and Social Epidemiology

See also
Meléndez
Torres (surname)

Compound surnames
Spanish-language surnames